Henriette Charlotte of Nassau-Idstein (9 November 1693 – 8 April 1734), was a German noblewoman member of the House of Nassau and by marriage Duchess of Saxe-Merseburg.

Born in Idstein Castle, Idstein, she was the fourth of twelve children born from the marriage of George August, Count and since 1688 Prince of Nassau-Saarbrücken-Idstein and Henriette Dorothea of Oettingen-Oettingen. From her eleven older and younger siblings, only four survived to adulthood: Christine Louise (by marriage Princess of East Frisia), Albertine Juliane (by marriage Hereditary Princess of Saxe-Eisenach), Auguste Fredericka (by marriage Princess of Nassau-Weilburg) and Johannette Wilhelmine (by marriage Countess of Lippe-Detmold).

Life
In Idstein on 4 November 1711, Henriette Charlotte secretly married Maurice Wilhelm, Duke of Saxe-Merseburg.

After eight years of childless union, on 23 June 1720, the Duchess gave birth to a daughter, Fredericka Ulrike, who died within hours. Although she officially appears as the Duke's daughter, it is highly probable that she was the product of the affair of her mother with Friedrich Carl von Pöllnitz, Henriette Charlotte's Hofmarshal and lover for several years.

After her husband's death in 1731, Henriette Charlotte retired to Delitzsch Castle, Delitzsch, where she openly lived with von Pöllnitz until her death three years later, aged 40. She was buried in the Stadtkirche SS Peter und Paul, Delitzsch.

References

|-

1693 births
1734 deaths
German countesses
German duchesses
House of Nassau
18th-century German people
Duchesses of Saxe-Merseburg
⚭Countess Henriette Charlotte of Nassauidstein
Daughters of monarchs